

Composition of the troupe of the Comédie-Française in 1680 
As of 24 August 1680, La Grange set in his register:
« Jonction de la Troupe Royalle cy-devant à l'hostel de bourgogne avec la nostre suivant les ordres du Roy ».
The new troupe consisted of 27 people, that is 15 actors and 12 actresses. The first performance took place on 25 August with Phèdre by Racine and Les Carosses d'Orléans by La Chapelle.

Sources 
Bert Edward Young and Grace Philputt Young, Le registre de La Grange (1659-1685), Paris, E. Droz, 1947, vol. I, .

1680
1680 in France